Elmont Memorial High School (EMHS) is a co-educational, public high school founded in 1956 for students in grades 7–12 in the hamlet of Elmont, Long Island, New York, in Nassau County, United States. The school is one of five secondary schools of the Sewanhaka Central High School District.

As of the 2018–19 school year, the school had an enrollment of 1,640 students and 109.0 classroom teachers (on an FTE basis), for a student–teacher ratio of 15.0:1. There were 620 students (37.8% of enrollment) eligible for free lunch and 153 (9.3% of students) eligible for reduced-cost lunch.

Its school newspaper is known as the "Elmont Phoenix". Elmont High School's mascot is the Spartan. Its school colors are green and white. The school's current principal is Kevin Dougherty. Elmont High School is part of the Sewanhaka Central High School District.

Awards and recognition
During the 1990–93 school year, Elmont Memorial High School was recognized with the Blue Ribbon School Award of Excellence by the United States Department of Education, the highest award an American school can receive.

In 2005, Elmont High School was recognized as having the largest number of African American high school students scoring a 3 or higher on Advanced Placement examinations in the country.

Elmont HS was also recognized by the College Board as having the largest number of African American students attaining a 3 or higher on the Advanced Placement U.S. History exam in the country.

Elmont Memorial from 1995–2006 had a 97% graduation rate, and in 2004 achieved a 100% graduation rate, a first in the Sewanhaka Central District.

Elmont Memorial also won the 2013 District Sports Night. This is the first time the school has won since 1997.

Academics
(adapted from the Sewanhaka Central High School District Catalog of Courses)

Levels of Study

Students may pursue one of two levels of study:
 Advanced: This is an accelerated program of instruction in which students are expected to maintain a grade point average of at least 85% to continue to the next advanced course in the sequence.
 Regents: Students pursue courses in the curriculum prescribed by the New York State Department of Education.
Grades 7 and 8
 Students are organized into "teams" including the Lions (Regular), Hurricanes (Regular), and Direwolves (Advanced). Teams are composed of students and core teachers in math, science, English, and social studies. This allows for the individual attention necessary for success at an early stage in secondary education.
 During the junior high school years, students pursue studies in English, Social Studies, Mathematics, Science, Foreign Languages, Music, Physical Education, Art, Technology, Family and Consumer Sciences, Health Education, Woodshop and Language Enrichment, as well as vocational studies. High school credit is awarded to eighth graders that pursue advanced coursework in science, mathematics, foreign language, and music.
 Teams include Advanced and Regular students. The regular team is divided into two separate teams based on students' last name.

Grades 9-12
 High school coursework is designed to fulfill requirements necessary for students interested in attending two-year colleges, four-year colleges, vocational schools, nursing programs, etc. Students receive either a Regents Diploma or Advanced Regents Diploma upon graduation.
 Sciences
Students must pursue at least three years of science coursework and must pass one New York State Regents examination for the Regents Diploma or two Regents examinations for the Advanced Regents Diploma. Courses of study include (note that courses may be pursued at either the Regents or Advanced levels):
Physical Setting: Earth Science, Living Environment/Biology, Chemistry, Physics, Ecology, Marine Biology, Anatomy and Physiology, Science Research.
 Foreign Languages
Students must pursue at least two years of a foreign language, beginning at the junior high school level. Students may pursue study up to the college level (credit offered through Adelphi University) and Advanced Placement. Languages offered include Spanish, French, and Italian. Students must pass a Foreign Language Regents for the Advanced Regents Diploma. Since the 2006-2007 school year, seventh grade students take a mini foreign language course.
 Mathematics
Students must pursue at least three years of coursework in mathematics. Students must pass the Comprehensive Math A examination for a Regents Diploma or two Regents examinations for an Advanced Regents Diploma. Coursework includes: Integrated Algebra, Geometry, Algebra II/Trigonometry, Pre-Calculus, Sequential Math III, Math 12, Discrete Math, Advanced Placement Statistics, and Advanced Placement Calculus AB.
 English
Students must pursue English during all four High School years. Students must also pass the English Regents examination. Coursework includes: English 9/9A, 10/10A, 11, English AP Language and Composition, 12RX, English AP Literature and Composition, Bible as Literature, Contemporary Drama, Creative Writing, Film Study, Mass Media, Modern Novel, Dramatics, Journalism, Public Speaking.
 Social Studies
Students must pursue Social Studies during all four high school years. All students must pass the Global Studies and U.S. History and Government Regents examinations. Courses include Global History I and Geography, Global History II and Geography, Advanced Placement World History, Advanced Placement European History, United States History and Government, Advanced Placement American History, Economics, Participation in Government, Advanced Placement Govt. and Politics, Contemporary World Issues, Global Connections, Psychology, Sociology.
 Art
Students are required to pursue at least one year of art. Coursework includes Studio in Art, Drawing and Painting I and II, Illustration and Design, Media Arts, Digital Design, Advanced Placement Art History.
 Business Education
Coursework is offered in Accounting, Introduction to Occupations, Business Communications, Keyboarding I and II, Personal Finance, Business Analysis, Business Law, Speedwriting, Principles of Marketing, E-Commerce, etc.
 Advanced Placement
Students interested in pursuing coursework at the Advanced Placement level must have at least an 85 average in their current course of study. AP coursework is available in: Biology, Physics B, Chemistry, Art History, European History, American History, World History, Language and Composition, Literature and Composition, Calculus AB, Spanish, French, Italian, and Government and Politics.

Music
The school has several performing arts groups, and credit is given for students in these groups. They include (note that there are separate groups at each school level):
 Orchestra (at the High School or Junior High School level)
 Concert Band (at the High School, 9th Grade, and Junior High School levels)
 Concert Choir (at the High School and Junior High School levels)
 Jazz Band
 Jazz Choir
 String Ensemble
 Marching Band
Students perform each year during the Winter and Spring Concerts, local events, and music competitions. Some students participate in their respective musical groups at the All-District, All-County, Long Island Invitational, and All-State levels, or join the Tri-M Music Honor Society.

Students may also pursue coursework in Music Theory.

Each year the Music Department puts on two theatre productions, a drama and a musical. Musicals the school has performed in the past include Dreamgirls, Les Misérables, The Wiz, Once On This Island, Aida, and Guys and Dolls.

Athletics
Elmont High School's football team were district champions for three years. The mascot of EMHS is the Spartans. Sports are offered at the Junior High, Junior Varsity, and Varsity levels and include:

 Basketball
 Soccer
 Baseball
 Riflery
 Football

 Softball
 Lacrosse
 Gymnastics (District)
 Swimming (District)
 Wrestling

 Volleyball
 Track
 Golf (District)
 Gymnastics
 Bowling (District)

 Track and Field
 Cheerleading (Junior High [7th and 8th grade], Junior Varsity [9th and 10th grade], and Varsity [11th and 12th grade])
 Weight Lifting

Students from all five schools in the Sewanhaka Central High School District participate in District Sports Night, a competition between schools.

Extracurricular activities
Other extracurricular groups include:

 Model United Nations
 Poetry Club
 Key Builder Club
 Cheerleading
 Critter Club
 Mock Trial Club
 Global Links**
 Key Club
 Foreign Language Honor Society
 National Honor Society
 National Junior Honor Society
 Tri-M Music Honor Society
 Mu Alpha Theta - Math Honor Society
 Business Honor Society
 Future Business Leaders of America
 Junior High Business Leaders
 National Art Honor Society
 Musical Society

 Talented and Gifted
 Technology Club
 Inter-cultural Society
 Images
 Newspaper
 Dance Team
 Literary Magazine
 Mathletes
 Peer Helpers
 Peer Mediation
 Operation Success
 SADD
 Rachel's Challenge Group
 Drama Club
 Spanish Club
 French Club
 Stage Crew
 Science Olympiad
 Student Council
 Science Research
 Yearbook

 Student Government
 Government Watchers
 The Inspirational Writers
 Foreign Language Teachers of Tomorrow
 Latino Leaders
 Pride Club
 Graphic design
 Photography and Film
 Elmont Artisans
 Elmont Step and Dance Teams
 Color Guard / Flag Squad
 Domestic Exchange Club
 Social Science

Notable alumni
 Nelson DeMille (born 1943), author
 Chelsea Hammond (born 1983), long jumper for Jamaica Olympic team (2008)
 Gary Marangi (born 1952), football quarterback
 Alan Peckolick (1940–2017), graphic designer
 Billy Phillips (born 1956) soccer goalkeeper and coach
 Rich the Kid (born 1992), rapper, singer, songwriter, record producer, record executive, and actor
 Marco Rivera (born 1972), football guard
 Bob Rozakis (born 1951), comic book writer and editor, creator of Bumblebee, The Calculator, Mister E; co-creator of 'Mazing Man and Hero Hotline
 Greg Senat (born 1994), OL in the NFL
Maju Varghese, attorney and director of the White House Military Office

References

Public high schools in New York (state)
Public middle schools in New York (state)
Schools in Nassau County, New York
1956 establishments in New York (state)
Educational institutions established in 1956